İsmet Uçma (1 January 1955 – 11 October 2021) was a Turkish politician and member of the Turkish Parliament. Uçma was a member of the Justice and Development Party and a MP for Istanbul. He died on 11 October 2021 due to lung cancer.

References 

1955 births
2021 deaths
Turkish writers
Turkish political people
Politicians from Istanbul
Justice and Development Party (Turkey) politicians
Members of the 24th Parliament of Turkey
Members of the 25th Parliament of Turkey
Members of the 26th Parliament of Turkey
Members of the 27th Parliament of Turkey